Pseudodiplospora is a genus of flowering plants belonging to the family Rubiaceae.

Its native range is Andaman Islands.

Species:
 Pseudodiplospora andamanica (N.P.Balakr. & N.G.Nair) Deb

References

Rubiaceae
Rubiaceae genera